Cherry blossom or Sakura is the blossom of cherry trees, genus Prunus.

Cherry blossom or Cherry blossoms may also refer to:

Cherry Blossoms (film), a 2008 German film directed by Doris Dörrie
Cherry Blossom (album), a 2020 album by the Vamps
"Cherry Blossom", a 1981 Seiko Matsuda song
Cherry Blossoms (marriage agency), a marriage agency
Sakura (cigarette), Japanese cigarettes produced by Japan Tobacco
Cherry Blossoms, nickname for the Japan national rugby union team
Cherry Blossom (candy), a type of chocolate bar produced by Hershey Canada Inc
A brand of British shoe polish made by Grangers International Ltd
"Cherry Blossoms", a song by Joe Satriani on his album What Happens Next

See also 
Cherryblossom, a Japanese rock band
Sakura (disambiguation)
Ōka (disambiguation)